Paul John James (born November 11, 1963) is a retired professional soccer player who played as a midfielder. He was a one-time CONCACAF champion who represented Canada at both the Los Angeles 1984 Olympic Games and 1986 FIFA World Cup in Mexico. He later worked as a soccer analyst and soccer coach. He is an honoured member of the Canada Soccer Hall of Fame.

In 1998, was granted his Canada Soccer Coaching "A" Licence. After working as a player-coach in the Canadian Soccer League, he later served as a coach with Canada's national youth teams from 1998 to 2001, including the FIFA U-20 World Cup in 2001. A graduate of Wilfrid Laurier University, James has added to his academic credentials by completing the prestigious Football Industries MBA (FIMBA) at the University of Liverpool in England.

In February 2012, Paul revealed he had suffered from a crack cocaine dependency for many years. Paul was on a hunger strike to protest his mistreatment by York University over his "Substance Disability".

Club career
James developed into a top class midfield player while with the Toronto Blizzard. On the Blizzard team, James scored against the then famed New York Cosmos. He played in the North American Soccer League  and Canadian Soccer League, where he earned first team all-star honours on four consecutive occasions. In 1986, he played in the National Soccer League with Toronto Blizzard. He also had a short stint with English league outfit Doncaster Rovers.

International career
Welsh-born James became a Canadian citizen in 1983 and arrived on the international scene when he made full appearances for Canada at the 1984 Olympics in Los Angeles. He made his senior debut for Canada in a December 1983 friendly match against Mexico in Irapuato,  James played in all four of Canada's games at Los Angeles Olympics including quarter final game against Brazil losing on penalty kicks

He made 46 international "A" appearances for Canada (two goals) as well as additional "B" appearances including the Olympic Games.

He scored a critical goal for Canada against Costa Rica in Toronto in 1985 that helped Canada qualify for the 1986 FIFA World Cup finals in Mexico. A member of the country's 1986 World Cup team, he played in all three games in the finals. He represented Canada in 7 World Cup qualifiers.

James then played for Canada on the famed occasion in St John's, Newfoundland and Labrador when the Canadian men's team qualified for the first time to the FIFA World Cup Championships winning the 1985 CONCACAF Championship in the process. Paul played in all three of Canada's FIFA World Cup games in Mexico, in June 1986 Singapore. Last two games for Canada were in 1993 against the United States (2–2) playing his final international aged 29, a March 1993 friendly match against South Korea (1–0) win.

International goals
Scores and results list Canada's goal tally first.

Coaching career
After serving as player/coach at Ottawa and London, James also coached at LeMoyne College in Syracuse, New York, leading them to within one game of an NCAA berth and an NCAA Division II national ranking as high as 12th, Niagara University and Under-20 national soccer team. As head coach of the Under-20 team, he led them to the 2001 FIFA World Youth Championship in Argentina 2001. James thus became the first Canadian to represent Canada at a FIFA World Championships both as a player and coach.

Through his coaching career, Paul has garnered six coach of the year awards at varying levels including; CSL, NCAA, and OUA. In 2007 James received the CIS (Canadian Interuniversity Sport) national coach of the year award. James has a reputation for developing successful soccer programmes. In 2008 James coached York to the CIS Canadian Championship game where they won the title. On January 16, 2010 James announced his departure from York University after serving with the Lions for six years. After that, he coached the Bahamas national football team.

Soccer analyst
From 2004 to 2008 he was an analyst for The Footy Show on The Score television network, along with James Sharman and the late Brian Budd. He also provided soccer analysis for GolTV in Canada. Paul has appeared on the CBC and Sportsnet on numerous occasions and currently writes for The Globe and Mail.

Early years 
Lived in Cardiff until July 3, 1980 when at 16 years of age he emigrated to Toronto, Canada, with his parents and sister Julie.

Departed Wales with a Canadian equivalent Grade 12 education and an athletic career which included being awarded Whitchurch High School's Athlete of the Year in 1980; two time Glamorgan champion at 800 metres with the fastest recorded times in Wales in 1977/78 for his age group; a third-place finish at the British Championships in the 1500 metres; excelled in football (soccer) which included competing for Cardiff Schoolboys, county of Glamorgan, Cardiff City Youth Team, and Newport County Reserves as a 15 year old; while also competing in first team high school rugby and cricket.

Oakville Soccer Club and Ontario Provincial Team 
In 1980/82 Paul John James played for the Oakville Minor Soccer club winning an Ontario provincial championship. In 1982 Paul John James played for the Ontario Provincial team who won the Canadian national championships.

Soccer achievements 
47 International Caps as a player; Competed in 1984 Los Angeles Olympic Games; Competed in 1986 FIFA World Cup in Mexico Professional player Toronto Blizzard, Hamilton Steelers, Doncaster Rovers, London Lasers, Ottawa Intrepid; Four Time Canadian Soccer League First Team All Star Player; Four CONCACAF Championships (2 player/2 coach); Canadian National Men's U20 Head Coach (98/01); Canadian National Men's U17 Assistant Coach (98/00); Canadian National Women's U20 Assistant Coach (2008) FIFA World Championship Argentina 2001; Professional Head Coach Ottawa (89); London (92); Collegiate Head Coach Lemoyne College, Niagara, York University; 6 Coach of The Year Awards; CIS National Women's Coach of the Year 2007; BA Wilfrid Laurier (1997);  MBA Football Industries (2002); Television Soccer Analyst: GOL TV,  The Score,  CBC, Sportsnet. Soccer Writer for the Globe and Mail;

Author, advocacy for human rights protection 
Authored Crack Open (2012); Owner Author Confronting the Stigma of Drug Addiction; Submissions to HRTO, Divisional Court of Appeal; Ontario Court of Appeal and Supreme Court of Canada (2012-2019).

References

External links
 
 
 Paul James NASL stats and jerseys
 

1963 births
Living people
Footballers from Cardiff
Welsh emigrants to Canada
Naturalized citizens of Canada
Soccer people from Ontario
Association football midfielders
Canadian soccer players
Canada men's international soccer players
Olympic soccer players of Canada
Footballers at the 1984 Summer Olympics
1986 FIFA World Cup players
Canadian expatriate soccer players
Canadian expatriate sportspeople in Mexico
British expatriate sportspeople in Mexico
Toronto Blizzard (1971–1984) players
C.F. Monterrey players
Liga MX players
Hamilton Steelers (1981–1992) players
Doncaster Rovers F.C. players
Ottawa Intrepid players
Toronto Blizzard (1986–1993) players
London Lasers players
North American Soccer League (1968–1984) players
Canadian Soccer League (1987–1992) players
Expatriate footballers in Mexico
Canadian soccer coaches
Niagara Purple Eagles men's soccer coaches
Canadian television sportscasters
Canadian soccer commentators
Wilfrid Laurier Golden Hawks soccer players
Alumni of the University of Liverpool
Canada Soccer Hall of Fame inductees
Expatriate football managers in the Bahamas
Bahamas national football team managers
Canadian National Soccer League players
CONCACAF Championship-winning players
Canadian expatriate sportspeople in England
Canadian expatriate sportspeople in the Bahamas